Biserjane is a settlement in the Municipality of Sveti Jurij ob Ščavnici in northeastern Slovenia. The area is part of the traditional region of Styria. It is now included with the rest of the municipality in the Mura Statistical Region.

There is archaeological evidence in the area of Late Bronze Age and Roman settlement.

Notable people
Notable people that were born or lived in Biserjane include:
 Anton Korošec (1872–1940), politician

References

External links
Biserjane at Geopedia

Populated places in the Municipality of Sveti Jurij ob Ščavnici